A  or , also called a "Quran stand" by English-speaking Muslims, is an X-shaped, foldable book rest or lectern used for placing holy books during recitation. It is designed to collapse into a flat form for portability and storage when not in use. This book rest, which is usually made of wood, but also increasingly made of other materials such as plastic, is commonly used by Muslims, Hindus, and Sikhs. Used historically for many generations in South Asian and Arab countries, it is used both to hold and ensure respect for holy books (such as the Qur'an in Islam, Ramayana in Hinduism, and Japji Sahib in Sikhism) by keeping them elevated off the floor.

Etymology 
The name "" ultimately derives from the Arabic word  meaning "camel saddle", referring to the resemblance of the unfolded lectern to a saddle.

History 
For centuries folding lecterns have served throughout the Islamic world as supports for large Qur’an books used during recitations. They were among the most valuable furnishings of every mosque and were decorated using a variety of techniques, including calligraphy and abstract floral arabesque motifs. Secondary literature maintains that the form of these lecterns had been derived from folding chairs such as those that had already been used in ancient Egypt.

Gallery

Notes

References 

Hindu culture
Islamic culture
Sikh culture
Religious furniture
Islamic terminology